George Thomas Marye Jr. (December 13, 1849 – September 2, 1933) was an American banker from San Francisco, appointed Ambassador to Russia by President Woodrow Wilson.

Biography
He was born on December 13, 1849, to George Thomas Marye Sr, in Baltimore, and studied at Cambridge University, graduating with first-class honors in 1872.

Arriving in Petrograd 18 months after Ambassador Curtis Guild had left post, he tried to renegotiate the 1832 trade treaty. He served during the first half of the First World War and witnessed the beginning of the end of the Romanov dynasty. In 1929, he published his journals under the title, Russia Observed: Nearing the End in Imperial Russia, containing observations of the Romanov family, Rasputin, and the Russian upper classes.

He died on September 2, 1933, in Washington, D.C.

References

1849 births
1933 deaths
Businesspeople from Baltimore
Alumni of the University of Cambridge
Ambassadors of the United States to Russia